Alexa Paige Knierim, née Scimeca (born June 10, 1991) is an American pair skater. With her skating partner, Brandon Frazier, she is the 2022 World champion, a 2022 Olympic silver medalist in the figure skating team event, the 2022 Grand Prix Final silver medalist, a two-time U.S. National champion (2021, 2023), and a three-time Grand Prix gold medalist.

With her husband and former skating partner, Chris Knierim, she is a 2018 Olympic bronze medalist in the figure skating team event, a two-time Four Continents medalist (2016 silver, 2014 bronze), a three-time Grand Prix medalist (1 silver, 2 bronze), and a three-time U.S. National champion (2015, 2018, 2020). At the 2018 Winter Olympics, the Knierims became the first American pair, and the second pair ever in history, to perform a quad twist at the Olympic Games.

Personal life
Alexa Scimeca was born June 10, 1991, in Addison, Illinois. She has two siblings, a brother, and a sister. She and Chris Knierim became skating partners in April 2012 and began dating about a month later. They became engaged on April 8, 2014, and married on June 26, 2016, in Colorado Springs, Colorado. Their skating partnership ended in February 2020. The couple lives in Irvine, California, where Alexa Scimeca Knierim trains with her current skating partner, Brandon Frazier, while Chris Knierim is a figure skating coach.

Skating career

Early career

Scimeca began skating in 1998. She was coached by Trish Cazeau Brown and Sergei Telenkov from 1998 to 2008, by Maria Jeżak-Athey in 2008–2009, and by Vadim Naumov and Evgenia Shishkova from 2010 to 2011.
In the 2011–2012 season, Scimeca began pair skating with Ivan Dimitrov, with whom she trained in Connecticut. In 2012, she moved to Colorado Springs, Colorado, and began being coached by Dalilah Sappenfield.

Teaming up with Chris Knierim and 2012-2013 season
Sappenfield suggested that Scimeca skate with Chris Knierim. They teamed up in April 2012. They began training with Sappenfield, Larry Ibarra, and various other coaches at the Broadmoor World Arena in Colorado Springs, Colorado.

In October, Scimeca/Knierim won the gold medal in their first-ever international event, the 2012 Coupe Internationale de Nice. After several withdrawals by other teams, they received a Grand Prix assignment, the 2012 NHK Trophy in November, where they placed fourth.

The pair won the silver medal at the 2013 U.S. Championships in January. They were assigned to the 2013 Four Continents Championships but withdrew just before the event when Scimeca injured her right foot in practice. Scimeca/Knierim were named to the U.S. team for the 2013 World Championships after Caydee Denney / John Coughlin withdrew. They placed ninth in their World Championships debut in March.

2013–2014 season
Scimeca/Knierim experienced a setback that hampered their season when Knierim broke his left fibula in July. He underwent surgery that placed a metal plate and nine screws in his ankle. While Knierim was able to heal relatively quickly, the team believed they rushed back to competition a bit too soon. In January, they won the pewter medal at the 2014 U.S. Championships and were named second alternates to the 2014 Winter Olympic team. They then won the bronze medal at the 2014 Four Continents Championships. Their second-place short program score of 66.04 set a new record for the highest score ever achieved by a U.S. pair team. Knierim had additional surgery in March to remove the metal hardware in his leg, which had been causing discomfort.

2014–2015 season: First national title
Scimeca/Knierim won the gold medal in their first ISU Challenger series event, the 2014 U.S. International Classic, and won the bronze medal at 2014 Nebelhorn Trophy. They were assigned two Grand Prix events, placing fourth at both 2014 Skate America and 2014 Trophée Éric Bompard.

At the 2015 U.S. Championships, Scimeca/Knierim captured their first national title, setting new U.S. record scores in both the short program and the free skate. They also became the first American pair team in history to perform a quadruple twist in competition.

At the 2015 Four Continents Championships, Scimeca/Knierim placed fifth and earned new ISU personal best scores of 124.44 in the free skate and 187.98 total, setting new records for the highest scores ever achieved by a U.S. pair team in an international event. At the 2015 World Championships, the pair placed 7th, the highest finish by a U.S. pair since 2011. They then competed at the 2015 World Team Trophy, finishing 4th in the short program and 3rd in the free skate, which ultimately was a key factor in Team USA winning the gold medal. Scimeca/Knierim earned new personal best scores of 127.87 in the free skate and 192.09 total, setting new records once again for the highest scores ever recorded by a U.S. pair team in international competition.

Scimeca/Knierim won SKATING magazine's 2015 Readers’ Choice Skaters of the Year Award, also known as the Michelle Kwan Trophy.

2015–2016 season: First Grand Prix medals and silver at Four Continents 
Scimeca/Knierim began their season at 2015 Nebelhorn Trophy, where they won the silver medal behind reigning Olympic champions Tatiana Volosozhar / Maxim Trankov. The team then competed at 2015 Skate America where they won their first Grand Prix medal, a silver. They placed 1st in the short program with a new personal best score of 69.69, setting a new record for the highest score ever achieved by a U.S. pair team in international competition. The following week, they won the gold medal at 2015 Ice Challenge in Graz, Austria.

Scimeca/Knierim went on to win the bronze medal at 2015 NHK Trophy, which helped qualify them for the 2015–16 Grand Prix Final in Barcelona, where they placed seventh. They were the first U.S. pair since 2007 to qualify for the Grand Prix Final. The pair entered the 2016 U.S. Championships as the heavy favorite for the title but won the silver medal.

At the 2016 Four Continents Championships, Scimeca/Knierim won the silver medal in their best competitive outing to date. They earned new personal best scores of 140.35 in the free skate and 207.96 total, which were the highest scores ever recorded by a U.S. pair team in international competition under that version of the judging system. A subsequent injury to Knierim limited the team's training before the 2016 World Championships, where they placed 9th. They were 7th in the short program with a personal best score of 71.37, which set a new record for the highest score ever achieved by a U.S. pair team in international competition. The pair then competed for Team North America at the inaugural 2016 Team Challenge Cup, where the team won the gold medal.

2016–2017 season: Major illness, surgery, and successful return
Alexa Scimeca Knierim became sick in April 2016, and her illness interrupted the Knierims' training throughout the summer months. She was properly diagnosed with a rare, life-threatening gastrointestinal condition in August and underwent two abdominal surgeries that month. The pair resumed light training in late September. Alexa Knierim underwent additional surgery on November 1 and returned to training by the middle of that month.

Alexa Knierim's illness involved regular episodes of vomiting, debilitating pain, difficulties with sleeping, eating, or drinking, and significant weight loss. Already small, she lost 20 pounds and shrunk to just over 80 pounds. Knierim stated that when his wife initially returned to the ice following surgery, she had to hold his hands just to skate a lap around the rink and could only skate for 10 minutes before having to go home for a nap because it was so physically draining on her body. The pair withdrew from both of their Grand Prix events, the 2016 Rostelecom Cup and 2016 Cup of China, and the 2017 U.S. Championships. They resumed full training in January and were named to the U.S. team for both the 2017 Four Continents Championships and the 2017 World Championships.

In February, the Knierims made a strong return to competition at the 2017 Four Continents Championships, where they placed sixth in a deep field of Chinese and Canadian pairs. Their total score was the second-highest score ever achieved by a U.S. pair team, behind only their score from Four Continents the prior year. The pair then competed at the 2017 World Championships, where they skated two strong programs and placed 10th in an exceptionally deep field. Just 4.35 points separated 5th through 10th place. They placed 8th in the short program with a personal best score of 72.17, the highest score ever achieved by a U.S. pair team under that version of the judging system. They were the only U.S. pair to qualify for the free skate.

Their total score of 202.37 was the second highest in U.S. pairs history, and they would remain the only U.S. pair to have ever surpassed the 200-point barrier under that version of the judging system. This was the Knierims' fourth top 10 finish in their four Worlds appearances. They were the only U.S. pair in the previous five years to have earned top-10 finishes at the World Championships.

2017–2018 season: Second national title and Pyeongchang Olympics
The Knierims began their season at the 2017 U.S. International Classic, where they won the silver medal and were narrowly edged by Canadians Kirsten Moore-Towers and Michael Marinaro. They placed 1st in the free skate after changing their long program the week before the event. The team then competed at two Grand Prix events, 2017 NHK Trophy and 2017 Skate America, where they placed a solid fifth in deep fields at both events. It was revealed after Skate America that Chris Knierim was recovering from a patella injury. The Knierims had been the top U.S. finisher at every international event they had entered for the past three years. Their scores throughout the Grand Prix season were the clear highest by a U.S. pair team.

At the 2018 U.S. Championships, the Knierims won their second National title with a score of 206.60. They placed 1st in the short program, 1st in the free skate, and performed a quadruple twist in competition for the first time since 2016. They are one of the only pairs in the world capable of doing a quad twist. Following the event, the Knierims were named to the 2018 U.S. Olympic Team that competed at the 2018 Winter Olympics in Pyeongchang, South Korea. They were the sole U.S. pair team at this Olympic Games.

At the 2018 Winter Olympics, the Knierims won an Olympic bronze medal in the figure skating team event as a key part of the U.S. team. They placed a strong 4th in the short program with a season's best score, defeating top pairs from China, France, and Italy. They then placed 4th in the free skate. Their total combined score was the highest of their season. In the pair event, they were fourteenth in the short program and placed fifteenth overall in what was the strongest Olympic pair competition to date. In the free skate, the Knierims became the first U.S. pair, and the second pair ever in history, to successfully perform a quad twist at the Olympics.

Weeks later, the Knierims competed at the 2018 World Championships. They placed eleventh in the short program with a strong performance and were less than three points from the top 5. They finished fifteenth overall after an uncharacteristically shaky skate by Alexa that included a fall on a death spiral. They were the only U.S. pair to qualify for the free skate for the second consecutive year.

On May 14, 2018, U.S. Figure Skating announced that the Knierims had left their coach, Dalilah Sappenfield, to train with 2018 Olympic champion Aljona Savchenko and her coaching staff. They began training part-time in Oberstdorf, Germany.

2018–2019 season: Third Grand Prix medal and coaching changes
The Knierims started their season at 2018 Nebelhorn Trophy, where they won the silver medal. They placed 1st in the short program and finished 2nd overall, just one point from 1st. They then competed at their first Grand Prix event of the season, 2018 Skate America, where they placed 4th. They were without a coach at the event, and it was announced on October 20, 2018, in the middle of the free skate, that they had very recently split from their coach Aljona Savchenko, which the Knierims confirmed after the event.

In early November, the Knierims won the bronze medal at their second Grand Prix event, 2018 NHK Trophy, ahead of Canadians Kirsten Moore-Towers and Michael Marinaro. They were coached at the event by Todd Sand and had relocated to California during the two weeks between their Grand Prix events. They officially began training with Jenni Meno and Todd Sand in late November. In early December, they won the silver medal at 2018 Golden Spin of Zagreb, placing 1st in the free skate and finishing one point from 1st overall.

In January at the 2019 U.S. Championships, the Knierims placed a very unexpected seventh after a series of unusual mishaps. In the short program, they had an uncharacteristic big error on their signature triple twist, typically their best element. In the free skate, they surprisingly aborted their second lift and missed their third lift entirely. It was revealed after the competition that Chris Knierim had been suffering from a torn wrist ligament that required surgery to repair. He remarked afterward that "the program went how our year went, a lot of unplanned mishaps." He underwent surgery to repair his wrist during the off-season.

2019–2020 season: Third national title and split
The Knierims added Rafael Arutyunyan to their coaching team during the off-season. They had a strong start to their season at 2019 CS Nebelhorn Trophy, where they won the silver medal with a total score of 202.41. Their free skate score of 131.58 was the highest score ever achieved by a U.S. pair team under the current version of the judging system.

The Knierims then competed at their first Grand Prix event of the season, Skate Canada, where they skated strongly and placed fourth, less than three points behind reigning World silver medalists Evgenia Tarasova and Vladimir Morozov.  At their second Grand Prix event, 2019 NHK Trophy, they placed fifth in the short program with a fall and a completely invalidated death spiral. After a free skate with many errors, including a costly missed lift, they placed seventh overall.

In January at the 2020 U.S. Championships, the Knierims won their third national title with a score of 216.15, the highest score ever achieved in U.S. competition. They skated a completely clean short program and scored 77.06, a new record at the U.S. Championships, and won that segment by nearly seven points. After leaving some points on the table in an otherwise strong free skate performance, they placed second in that segment and first overall after having a nearly ten-point lead over silver medalists Calalang/Johnson from the short program. The Knierims were the first U.S. pair team to win three national titles since 2002.

Less than two weeks after the U.S. Championships, the Knierims competed at the 2020 Four Continents Championships in Seoul. In the short program, they both erred on their side-by-side jump, and then Chris slipped on the entry to their side-by-side spin, invalidating the element. They placed fifth in the segment. The Knierims withdrew the morning of the free skate, citing family illness.

The Knierims were on the official entry list for the 2020 World Championships that was released on February 26, but on that same day, it was announced that Chris Knierim was stepping away from the sport, citing injuries and ongoing bouts of depression that had come to a head at the Four Continents Championships. It was also announced that Alexa Knierim would seek a new partner to continue her skating career. She stated, "I'm his wife over being his partner. We know skating ends, and life continues. For us, our marriage, our relationship is what's important." Chris Knierim added, "I look forward to watching her keep skating and will support her in every way I can. Alexa is very tenacious and strong. She's fire on the ice. Nothing can stop her."

2020–2021 season: New partnership, first Grand Prix title, and fourth national title

On April 1, Alexa Knierim announced that she was teaming up with Brandon Frazier, who had split with his former partner, Haven Denney. The new pair began training together in May 2020 due to restrictions caused by the COVID-19 pandemic. They train in Irvine, California, at Great Park Ice, with coaches Todd Sand, Jenni Meno, Rafael Arutunian, Chris Knierim, and Christine Binder. They also take lessons remotely from coach Nina Mozer.

Knierim/Frazier won the gold medal in their Grand Prix debut at 2020 Skate America, which also marked their competitive debut as a pair. This event was attended by skaters training in the United States due to travel restrictions caused by the COVID-19 pandemic. The pair skated strongly and solidly in both programs, placing 1st in the short program with a score of 74.19 and 1st the free skate with a score of 140.58, for a total of 214.77 to earn their first Grand Prix title.

At the 2021 U.S. Championships in January, Knierim/Frazier won their first national title together with a score of 228.10, the highest score ever achieved in U.S. competition. They placed 1st in the short program with a score of 77.46 and 1st in the free skate with a score of 150.64, setting new U.S. Championship records in both segments. They won the gold medal by a dominant 23-point margin with two strong and well-executed programs. Knierim is the first pair skater to win four U.S. national titles since Kyoko Ina, who won her fifth title in 2002. She is also the first U.S. pair skater to win consecutive national titles with two different partners since 2012.

At the 2021 World Championships in March, Knierim/Frazier placed 7th in their Worlds debut. They skated well enough to finish 7th in both segments of the competition, despite Frazier doubling his planned triple jump in the short program and the pair counting multiple errors in the free skate. This was the best result by a U.S. pair since 2015 when Knierim achieved the same placement with her former partner.

In April, Knierim/Frazier competed at the 2021 World Team Trophy and helped Team USA win the silver medal. They placed second among the pairs after finishing fourth in the short program and second in the free skate. Their free skate score was the highest score a U.S. pair has ever received from an international judging panel under the current judging system.

2021–2022 season: Beijing Olympics and World Champions
Knierim/Frazier skated strongly at the Cranberry Cup International, where they won the silver medal behind Russian pair Evgenia Tarasova and Vladimir Morozov. Their score of 205.87 was a new international personal best. In September, they won the gold medal at the John Nicks Pairs Challenge, an ISU international competition in New York City. They placed 1st in both segments of the competition with two strong programs and earned all new personal best scores. Their total score of 212.55 was the highest score a U.S. pair has ever achieved under an international judging panel.

In their first Grand Prix event of the season, 2021 Skate America, Knierim/Frazier placed fourth and narrowly missed the podium, just 2.56 points behind reigning World bronze medalists Boikova/Kozlovskii. They were fifth in the short program after Frazier fell out of his triple jump. They placed second in the free skate with a strong performance, earning a new personal best score and surpassing their own record for the highest score a U.S. pair has ever earned under the current international judging system. At their second Grand Prix event, the 2021 Internationaux de France, the pair won the bronze medal. They were narrowly fourth in the short program, 1.69 points behind Canadians James/Radford, and then delivered a strong free skate to overtake the Canadians and place third in that segment just 0.59 points behind the second place Russian pair. They then competed at a Challenger event, 2021 Golden Spin of Zagreb, where they placed second in the short program, just 0.51 out of first place. After an uncharacteristically shaky free skate, they finished fifth overall.

Knierim/Frazier entered the 2022 U.S. Championships as the favorites to win and repeat as national champions. They had been the U.S. pair with the best results, the highest scores, and the most consistent scoring ability across an extended period leading into Nationals. After arriving at the competition, Frazier began to feel unwell, and he tested positive for COVID-19 on January 5, the day before the short program. The pair was forced to withdraw from the competition, and Frazier shared an emotional video message in which he expressed his devastation over not being able to compete. As the leading U.S. pair, Knierim/Frazier successfully petitioned and earned an Olympic spot. On January 9, they were named to the 2022 U.S. Olympic team and the 2022 World team, and Frazier stated he felt “100 percent back to normal.” Knierim added, “I am super honored and grateful to be named to the team with Brandon. I believe the best is yet to come. We were so ready and prepared to compete here this week, it was devastating for us, but obviously, right now, we’re on cloud nine." This was to be Frazier's first Olympic appearance, while Knierim became the first U.S. pair skater to make two Olympic teams in 20 years.

At the 2022 Winter Olympics in February, Knierim/Frazier were the American pair entry in the figure skating team event and helped the U.S. team win the silver medal. They placed a strong third in the short program segment with a clean skate and earned a new personal best score of 75.00 points. They then finished fifth in the free skate segment. In the pair event, Knierim/Frazier placed sixth, which was the best result by a U.S. pair in 20 years. They skated a clean short program and were in sixth place after that segment. In the free skate, they delivered another strong program and earned a new personal best score of 138.45 and a new personal best total score of 212.68. These scores surpassed their own records for the highest scores ever achieved by a U.S. pair under the international judging system. Frazier called the experience a "true dream come true."

In March, Knierim/Frazier competed at the 2022 World Championships in Montpellier, France. Russian skaters were banned from competing by the International Skating Union due to their country's invasion of Ukraine, and the Chinese Skating Association also did not send athletes to compete. As those countries’ athletes comprised the entirety of the top five pairs at the Olympics, this had a big impact on the field for Worlds, and Knierim/Frazier entered the event as medal favorites. After skating strongly in both the short program and the free skate, the pair won their first world title by a 22 point margin with a personal best score of 221.09. They won the short program with a personal best score of 76.88. They won the free skate with another new personal best of 144.21. All of their scores set new records for the highest scores ever achieved by a U.S. pair internationally. Knierim/Frazier became the first American World champions in pairs since Babilonia/Gardner in 1979. Frazier said, "we couldn't have asked for a better ending of the season."

2022–2023 season
Knierim/Frazier began their season at 2022 Skate America, where they won the gold medal, their first Grand Prix title in a full-fledged Grand Prix event. They skated a solid short program to place first in that segment and went on to place first in the free skate as well. Frazier, speaking after the free skate, noted that it was their first event of the season and that "tonight was a fight, so a lot of grit out there." Knierim/Frazier became the first U.S. pair since 2006 and the third U.S. pair in history to win a Grand Prix title.

Knierim/Frazier won the gold medal at their second Grand Prix event, 2022 MK John Wilson Trophy, by a dominant 21.66-point margin. They earned all-new season's best scores and won both segments of the competition with a strong short program and some errors in the free skate. Knierim/Frazier became the first U.S. pair to win two Grand Prix events in one season, and the first U.S. pair to qualify to the Grand Prix Final since 2015 when Knierim qualified with her former partner.

At the 2022 Grand Prix Final, Knierim/Frazier won the silver medal, narrowly missing the gold medal by just one point. They entered the event as co-favorites for the title alongside the top-seeded Miura/Kihara of Japan. In the short program, they skated cleanly except for a hand down by Frazier on their side-by-side jump, and earned a new personal best score of 77.65 to place second, only 0.43 points behind Miura/Kihara. They followed it up in the free skate with another strong performance with two shaky jumps and earned new season's best free skate and total scores. They were narrowly outscored in that segment, just 0.87 behind Miura/Kihara's skate which contained errors. Knierim/Frazier became the first U.S. pair in history to win a Grand Prix Final medal. Their total score was the second highest ever by a U.S. pair in international competition, behind only their score from the World Championships the previous season. 

At the 2023 U.S. Championships, Knierim/Frazier won their second national title by a dominant 31.11 points, the largest margin of victory in history, which surpassed their own previous record set in 2021. They skated a clean short program and led the competition by a commanding 15.1 point margin. Their short program score of 81.96 set a new record for the highest score ever earned at the U.S. Championships. They went on to place first in the free skate as well with a strong performance en route to the gold medal. This was Knierim's fifth national title overall, tying her with five other skaters for the most U.S. titles by a pair skater in the past 75 years. Knierim/Frazier declined assignment to the 2023 Four Continents Championships, opting instead to participate in Art on Ice shows in Switzerland.

Programs

With Frazier

With Knierim

With Dimitrov

Competitive highlights
GP: Grand Prix; CS: Challenger Series

With Frazier

With Knierim

With Dimitrov

Detailed results
Small medals for short and free programs awarded only at ISU Championships. At team events, medals awarded for team results only. ISU personal best scores highlighted in bold. Personal best scores from before the 2018-2019 judging system change are highlighted in bold and italic. These scores also denote the highest scores ever achieved by a U.S. pair under that system.

With Frazier

With Knierim

References

External links
 
 
 Alexa Knierim / Brandon Frazier at US Figure Skating Fan Zone
 Alexa Knierim / Chris Knierim at US Figure Skating Fan Zone
 
 
 

1991 births
Living people
American female pair skaters
Figure skaters from Colorado Springs, Colorado
People from Addison, Illinois
Olympic silver medalists for the United States in figure skating
Olympic bronze medalists for the United States in figure skating
Figure skaters at the 2018 Winter Olympics
Figure skaters at the 2022 Winter Olympics
Medalists at the 2018 Winter Olympics
Medalists at the 2022 Winter Olympics
Four Continents Figure Skating Championships medalists
World Figure Skating Championships medalists
21st-century American women
20th-century American women